The Tennis Integrity Unit was the organisation responsible for investigating match fixing in tennis since 2008 until 2020. It was replaced by the International Tennis Integrity Agency. It had the ability to impose fines and sanctions, and ban players, umpires, and other tennis officials from participating in tournaments.

The organisation was an initiative from the ITF, ATP, WTA, and the four Grand Slam tournaments (the Australian Open, French Open, Wimbledon and US Open). It was set up after an investigation into allegations of match fixing in 2008.

Last investigations and sanctions
Last updated on: 19 December 2020.

Last suspensions
See current suspensions in International Tennis Integrity Agency.
  Majed Kilani (match official suspended for seven years + US$7,000 fine to be repaid in equal yearly payments)
  Armando Alfonso Belardi Gonzalez (suspended for two years and six months + US$5,000 fine with US$4,000 suspended)
  Jonathan Kanar (suspended for four years and 6 months + US$2,000 fine)
  Juan Carlos Saez (eight year suspension)
  Issam Taweel (five year suspension with two years suspended + US$15,000 fine with US$13,000 suspended)
  Henry Atseye (three year suspension, with one year suspended + US$5,000 fine with US$2,500 suspended)
  Marc Fornell-Mestres (provisionally suspended)
  Potito Starace (10 year suspension + US$100,000 fine)
  Patricio Heras (suspended + US$25,000 fine)
  Nicolas Kicker (suspended + US$25,000 fine)
  Barlaham Zuluaga Gaviria (suspended for three years + US$5,000 fine)
  Nikita Kryvonos (suspended + US$20,000 fine)
  Piotr Gadomski (suspended + US$15,000 fine)
  Gerard Joseph Platero Rodriguez (suspended for four years + US$15,000 fine)
  Antonis Kalaitzakis  (tournament director suspended for 16 months + US$3,000 fine)
  Alexey Izotov (chair empire suspended for three years + US$10,000 fine)

Banned
  Gerard Joseph Platero Rodriguez (banned for four years with six months suspended + US$15,000 fine)
  Nick Lindahl (seven year ban + US$35,000 fine)
  Enrique López Pérez (banned for eight years + US$25,000 fine)*
  Yuri Khachatryan (banned for 10 years + US$50,000 fine)
  Pertti Vesantera (coach banned for five years + US$15,000 fine)
  George Kennedy (banned for seven months + US$10,000 fine + US$9,000 suspended)
  David Rocher (line umpire banned for one year and six months + US$5,000 fine + US$4,000 suspended)
* Suspension contested and lifted by Superior Court of Justice of Madrid, Spain.

Lifetime ban
  Youssef Hossam
  Joao Olavo Soares de Souza (+ US$200,000 fine)
  Diego Matos (+ US$125,000 fine + US$12,000 refund)
  Helen Ploskina (+ US$20,000 fine)
  Mauricio Alvarez-Guzman
  Daniele Bracciali (+ US$250,000 fine)
  Gleb Alekseenko (+ US$250,000 fine)
  Vadim Alekseenko (+ US$250,000 fine)
  Anucha Tongplew (chair empire)
  Apisit Promchai (chair empire)
  Chitchai Srililai (chair empire)
  Karim Hossam (+ US$15,000 fine)
  Dmytro Badanov (+ US$100,000 fine)
  Junn Mitsuhashi (+ US$50,000 fine)
  Konstantinos Mikos
  Alexandru-Daniel Carpen
  Joshua Chetty
  Alexandros Jakupovic
  Morgan Lamri (tennis official)
  Andrey Kumantsov
  Sergei Krotiouk(+ US$60,000 fine)
  Daniel Koellerer (+ US$100,000 fine)
  Karen Khachatryan (+ US$250,000 fine)
  Stanislav Poplavskyy (+ US$10,000 fine)
  Aleksandrina Naydenova (+ US$150,000 fine)
  Aymen Ikhlef (+ US$100,000 fine)

See also

 International Tennis Federation
 ATP Challenger Tour
 ATP rankings
 List of ATP number 1 ranked singles tennis players
 List of ATP number 1 ranked doubles tennis players
 ATP Awards
 ATP Tour records
 Grand Prix Tennis Circuit
 World Championship Tennis
 ATP Champions Tour
 Grand Slam (tennis)
 Women's Tennis Association
 International Tennis Integrity Agency

References

External links 
 Official website

Tennis organizations

Roehampton
Organisations based in the London Borough of Wandsworth
Sport in the London Borough of Wandsworth
2008 establishments in England
Sports organizations established in 2008
2020 disestablishments in England
Sports organizations disestablished in 2020